Thomas Edison Lewis (October 7, 1931 – October 12, 2014) was an American gridiron football player.  He played fullback for the Alabama Crimson Tide.

Playing career
Lewis scored two touchdowns in the team's 1953 Orange Bowl victory over Syracuse.

In the first quarter of the 1954 Cotton Bowl Classic against Rice, he scored his team's only touchdown to give the Crimson Tide a 6–0 lead. Lewis is best remembered for his second quarter off-the-bench tackle of Rice’s halfback Dicky Moegle on a running play that started at the Rice 5-yard line. Moegle took the handoff and raced along the sideline near the Alabama bench.  As Moegle passed midfield, Lewis (wearing jersey number 42) sprang from the bench to tackle Moegle. The referee awarded Rice a 95-yard touchdown on the play. Rice won the game, 28–6. Lewis explained his tackle by saying that he "was just too full of Alabama." Lewis and Moegle later appeared together on The Ed Sullivan Show.

Lewis also played in the Canadian Football League (CFL) with the Ottawa Rough Riders.

Coaching career
In 1962, Lewis became the head coach of the Huntsville Rockets, an expansion club in the minor Dixie Professional Football League.

References

External links
 Obituary
 

1931 births
2014 deaths
American football fullbacks
American players of Canadian football
Alabama Crimson Tide football players
Ottawa Rough Riders players
People from Greenville, Alabama
Players of American football from Alabama